Kareniaceae is a family of dinoflagellates belonging to the order Gymnodiniales.

Genera
 Asterodinium Sournia
 Brachidinium Sournia
 Gertia K.Takahashi et Iwataki
 Karenia G.Hansen et Moestrup
 Karlodinium Larsen
 Shimiella Ok, Jeong, Lee et Noh
 Takayama G.Hansen et Moestrup

References

Gymnodiniales
Dinoflagellate families